The 1974–75 NBA season was the 76ers 26th season in the NBA & 12th season in Philadelphia. The team was marginally better than in 1973–1974, posting a record of 34–48. Billy Cunningham returned to the 76ers, after a two-year stint in the ABA.

Offseason

Draft picks

Roster

Regular season

Season standings

z – clinched division title
y – clinched division title
x – clinched playoff spot

Record vs. opponents

References

Philadelphia
Philadelphia 76ers seasons
Philadel
Philadel